German submarine U-1206 was a Type VIIC U-boat of Nazi Germany's Kriegsmarine during World War II. She was laid down on 12 June 1943 at F. Schichau GmbH in Danzig and went into service on 16 March 1944. The submarine was scuttled on 14 April 1945 after being attacked by British forces after she was forced to the surface by problems arising from a malfunctioning plumbing system.

Design
German Type VIIC submarines were preceded by the shorter Type VIIB submarines. U-1206 had a displacement of  when at the surface and  while submerged. She had two shafts and two  propellers.

U-1206 was fitted with five  torpedo tubes (four fitted at the bow and one at the stern), fourteen torpedoes, one  SK C/35 naval gun, (220 rounds), one  Flak M42 and two twin  C/30 anti-aircraft guns. The boat had a complement of between forty-four and sixty.

Service history 

After being commissioned, under the command of Oberleutnant zur See Günther Fritze, the submarine took part in training exercises with the 8th U-boat Flotilla until July 1944 when it was assigned to the 11th U-boat Flotilla. Command was handed over to 27 year old Kapitänleutnant Karl-Adolf Schlitt. The boat was then fitted with a Schnorchel underwater-breathing apparatus before being released for patrol duties.

The boat's emblem was a white stork on a black shield with green beak and legs.

Patrols 

On 28 March 1945 the submarine departed from Kiel for its first training patrol in the North Sea, returning on 30 March. The submarine departed from Horten Naval Base for a one-day patrol on 2 April, and its first active patrol began on 6 April when it departed from Kristiansand.

Fate 
U-1206 was one of the late-war boats fitted with new deepwater high-pressure toilets which allowed them to be used while running at depth. Flushing these facilities was an extremely complicated procedure and special technicians were trained to operate them. Incorrectly opening valves in the wrong sequence could result in waste or seawater flowing back into the hull.

According to the Commander's official report, while in the engine room helping to repair one of the diesel engines, he was informed that a malfunction involving the toilet caused a leak in the forward section. The leak flooded the submarine's batteries (located beneath the head) causing them to generate chlorine gas, leaving him with no alternative but to surface. Once surfaced, U-1206 was discovered and bombed by British patrols, forcing Schlitt to scuttle the submarine. One man had died of illness a day before the mishap, three men drowned in the heavy seas after abandoning the vessel and 46 were captured.

The site survey performed by RCAHMS suggests that the leak that forced U-1206 to surface may have occurred after running into a pre-existing wreck located at the same site.

See also
 Toilet-related injuries and deaths

Notes

Footnotes

References

Bibliography

German U-Boat Losses During World War II - Axel Niestle 1998, United States Naval Inst.

External links

Kriegsmarine and U-Boat history List of U-1206 crew members -ubootwaffe.net
Poo Sank This Nazi Sub in Vice Magazine

German Type VIIC submarines
U-boats commissioned in 1944
U-boats sunk in 1945
World War II submarines of Germany
1943 ships
Ships built in Danzig
U-boat lost in diving accidents
World War II shipwrecks in the North Sea
Ships built by Schichau
Maritime incidents in April 1945